Southern Schleswig Danish is a variety of the Danish language spoken in Southern Schleswig in Northern Germany. It is a variety of Standard Danish influenced by the surrounding German language in relation to prosody, syntax and morphology, used by the Danish minority in Southern Schleswig.

Originally Southern Jutlandic was spoken in most parts of the area (in the variants of Angel Danish and Mellemslesvigsk). On the western coast, North Frisian was also spoken. After the language shift in the 18th, 19th and 20th centuries, most of the Danish and North Frisian dialects were replaced by Low and Standard German.

Accordingly, there is a Northern Schleswig variety of German language in Northern Schleswig. A similar phenomenon is Gøtudanskt on the Faroe Islands.

Further reading 
 Elin Fredsted in: Christel Stolz: Unsere sprachlichen Nachbarn in Europa. Brockmeyer-Verlag, Bochum 2009, 9783819607417
 Hans Christophersen: Det danske Sprog i Sydslesvig, Rostras Forlag, 3. Udgave  – http://www.rostra.dk/dansk/dansprog.htm
 Karen Margrethe Pedersen: Dansk sprog i Sydslesvig. Bd. 1–2. Institut for grænseregionsforskning, Aabenraa 2000.

References

Danish dialects
Languages of Denmark
Languages of Germany
Danish minority of Southern Schleswig